No. 630 Squadron RAF was a heavy bomber squadron of the Royal Air Force during the Second World War.

History

The squadron was formed at RAF East Kirkby, near Spilsby in Lincolnshire on 15 November 1943 from 'B' Flight of No. 57 Squadron RAF, equipped with Lancaster Mk.I bombers as part of No. 5 Group RAF in Bomber Command. It re-equipped with Lancaster Mk.III bombers the same month, carrying out strategic bombing roles. 
Between 18/19 November 1943 and 25 April 1945, the squadron took part in many major raids, including each of the 16 big raids made by Bomber Command on the German capital during what became known as the "Battle of Berlin".

Operational service

The units first operation was the night of 18/19 November 1943 when 9 of its Lancasters bombed Berlin and its last bombing sortie was 25 April 1945 with 5 Lancasters bombing Obersalzberg. Its last military operation was minelaying in Onions area (Oslofjord off Horten) on 25/26 April 1945.

Following April 1945 the squadron became involved in Operation Exodus: ferrying POWs back to Britain, finally disbanding on 18 July 1945.

Aircraft operated

See also
List of Royal Air Force aircraft squadrons

References

Notes

Bibliography

External links

 - 630 Squadron detailed history
 - 57 & 630 Squadron Association
 630Squadron.co.uk – The 630 Squadron Home Page
 630 Squadron history on RAF website
 No. 630 Squadron RAF movement and equipment history
 History of No.'s 621–650 Squadrons at RAF Web
 Wartime memories of 630 Squadron
 Les Amis De G. Allan Bullocks 
 

Bomber squadrons of the Royal Air Force in World War II
630 Squadron
Military units and formations established in 1943
Military units and formations disestablished in 1945